The 2000–01 season was Manchester City Football Club's 109th season playing in a division of English football, most of which have been spent in the top flight.
The club spent this season playing in the Premier League after winning promotion from the First Division in the previous season. This was the club's fifth season playing in the Premier League since its initial formation as the top tier of English football eight years earlier, with Manchester City as one of its original 22 founding member clubs.

Season review
Manchester City's return to the Premiership after a four-year exile was the result of back-to-back promotions from the Second Division. But perhaps the team's two-tier climb back to the top flight again had been a little too rapid because it became apparent after just a few games into the new season that Joe Royle's men would be struggling to hang on to their newly acquired top flight status. After their first ten games though, they were enjoying reasonably stable mid-table form with four wins and defeats each; however, after a 5–0 humbling at Arsenal, it all went wrong and only four wins were achieved during the remainder of the season.

The team's relegation was confirmed by a defeat in the penultimate game of the season, and manager Royle, who had been the guiding hand that had brought the team so quickly back to the Premiership from the Second Division, was dismissed within days. Former England coach Kevin Keegan was appointed to replace Royle on a three-year contract and fans were given renewed hope of an immediate return to the elite.

Team kit
The team kit was produced by Le Coq Sportif and the shirt sponsor was Eidos Interactive.

Historical league performance
Prior to this season, the history of Manchester City's performance in the English football league hierarchy since the creation of the Premier League in 1992 is summarised by the following timeline chart – which commences with the last season (1991–92) of the old Football League First Division (from which the Premier League was formed).

Final league table

Results summary

Results by round

Results
Manchester City's score comes first

Legend

FA Premier League

FA Cup

League Cup

First-team squad
Squad at end of season

Left club during season

Reserve squad

Statistics

Appearances and goals

|-
! colspan=14 style=background:#dcdcdc; text-align:center| Goalkeepers

|-
! colspan=14 style=background:#dcdcdc; text-align:center| Defenders

|-
! colspan=14 style=background:#dcdcdc; text-align:center| Midfielders

|-
! colspan=14 style=background:#dcdcdc; text-align:center| Forwards

|-
! colspan=14 style=background:#dcdcdc; text-align:center| Players transferred out during the season

Starting 11
Considering starts in all competitions

Transfers

In
  Alfie Haaland –  Leeds United, 12 June, £2,500,000
  George Weah –  Milan, 1 August, free
  Paulo Wanchope –  West Ham United, 8 August, £3,650,000
  Steve Howey –  Newcastle United, 11 August, £2,000,000 (rising to £3,000,000 depending on appearances)
  Paul Ritchie –  Rangers, 21 August, £500,000
  Richard Dunne –  Everton, 16 October, £3,000,000
  Laurent Charvet –  Newcastle United, 25 October, £1,000,000 (rising to £1,500,000 depending on appearances)
  Darren Huckerby –  Leeds United, 29 December, £2,500,000
  Carlo Nash –  Stockport County, 11 January, £100,000
  Andrei Kanchelskis –  Rangers, 25 January, three-month loan
  Egil Østenstad –  Blackburn Rovers, 5 February, two-month loan

Out
  Craig Russell –  St Johnstone, 11 July, free
  Lee Peacock –  Bristol City, 9 August, £600,000
  Jamie Pollock –  Crystal Palace, 11 August, £75,000
  Robert Taylor –  Wolverhampton Wanderers, 15 August, £1,550,000
  George Weah – released, 16 October (later joined  Marseille on 18 October)
  Nick Fenton –  Notts County, 9 November, £150,000
  Gary Mason –  Dunfermline Athletic, 15 December, free
  Ian Bishop –  Miami Fusion, 28 February, undisclosed
  Lee Crooks –  Barnsley, 2 March, undisclosed
  Tommy Wright –  Bolton Wanderers, 22 March, free
  Gareth Taylor –  Burnley, 22 March, loan
  Chris Shuker –  Macclesfield Town, 22 March, loan
  Andy Morrison –  Sheffield United, 22 March, loan
  Lee Crooks –  Northampton Town, December, loan
  Daniel Allsopp –  Notts County, December, £300,000
  Richard Jobson –  Tranmere Rovers
  Shaun Holmes – released
  David Laycock – released
  Chris Killen –  Wrexham, loan
  Danny Granville –  Norwich City, October, loan
  Terry Cooke –  Sheffield Wednesday, loan

References

Manchester City F.C. seasons
Manchester City